The Nielsen-Sanderson House	, at 12758 S. Fort St. in Draper, Utah, was listed on the National Register of Historic Places in 2018.

Its listing was noted by the Draper Historical Preservation Commission.

References

National Register of Historic Places in Salt Lake County, Utah